Konstantinos Moragiemos (born 18 November 1936) is a Greek former sprinter who competed in the 1960 Summer Olympics.

References

1936 births
Living people
Greek male sprinters
Olympic athletes of Greece
Athletes (track and field) at the 1960 Summer Olympics
Athletes from Athens
Athletes (track and field) at the 1959 Mediterranean Games
Mediterranean Games gold medalists for Greece
Mediterranean Games medalists in athletics
20th-century Greek people